Enemy is a 2021 Indian Tamil-language action thriller film written and directed by Anand Shankar and produced by Vinod Kumar under the banner of Mini Studios. The film features Vishal, Arya, Mirnalini Ravi, and Mamta Mohandas in the lead roles, while Prakash Raj, Thambi Ramaiah, and Karunakaran play supporting roles. The film received mixed reviews from critics and audience.

Plot 
1996: In Ooty, Chozhan Ramalingam and Rajiv Parirajan are two friends who are trained by Parirajan, Rajiv's father who is an ex-CBI officer. He enables them to join the police force. Although given equal training, Chozhan appears to best out Rajiv, causing the latter to turn jealous of the former. One day, Chozhan and Rajiv are playing chess in which Rajiv wins. While Rajiv leaves Chozhan pondering over the outcome, he sees Parirajan dead on the floor. The boys are escorted to the police station and although Chozhan tells the inspector and Ramalingam, Chozhan's risk-averse father, that he can bust the killer using his skills, Ramalingam takes Chozhan away, leaving Rajiv alone. 

2021: Chozhan becomes a departmental store owner, run by Ramalingam in Singapore. However, he has now evolved into a part-time vigilante and secretly thwarts minor crimes and corruption to help the Tamil community, One day, a gas company near his store suddenly bursts, which kills 11 Tamil people and severely injures five more. Chozhan nabs Joseph, the painter, who is behind the mess and hand him over to the police. The next day, Arundathi Mohan, who is the Indian External Affairs minister, comes to Singapore to address the Tamil people, but struggles to speak at the gathering and Chozhan immediately senses that her artificial cardiac pacemaker had been tampered by someone, and shoots to save her. 

Chozhan is caught by the police but is later released after they realized that he saved her. As soon as Chozhan tips off the police, they capture the culprit at a hotel revealed to be Rajiv; now a hardened assassin, who was hired by the Beijing corporate businessman to kill the External affairs minister of India. However, Rajiv escapes after threatening the policemen by killing their families. Chozhan meets up with Rajiv, who reveals the incident that happened on the day they separated: Rajiv was confronted by Parirajan who berated him for misusing his skills to loot some money, which made Rajiv kill his father. He also overheard him saying that Chozhan would eventually overshadow Rajiv in anything, thus inciting him to develop a permanent hatred towards Chozhan. 

After the revelation, Rajiv argues that he has evolved and grown in multiple ways and is way too advanced for Chozhan to intercept, while challenging him to rescue one of his close ones that he would soon kidnap. Chozhan calls everyone for a surprise wedding with Ashvitha. He did this to make sure his loved ones are always with him so none of them get kidnapped by Rajiv. At his engagement with Ashvitha, Chozhan realizes that his cousin's daughter, Pinky has gone missing from her school trip. Soon, Rajiv contacts him and informs him that he kidnapped Pinky from her school to kill her, but Chozhan responds by abducting Rajiv's pregnant wife Anisha. Chozhan threatens to kill Anisha if anything happens to Pinky. 

Chozhan and Rajiv meet in order to exchange their kins. As Rajiv releases Pinky over to Chozhan, Chozhan tells that he would not let go of this issue easily. He makes a deal with Rajiv: he will safely transport Anisha back to India if Rajiv surrenders to the police for the deaths of the 11 people. Rajiv agrees reluctantly and surrenders himself. As Chozhan transports Anisha to the airport, The hitman, sent by the Beijing businessman to kill Rajiv, learns about Anisha's connection to Rajiv, where he follows and slits her throat in the washroom. In prison, Rajiv finds out about Anisha's death on TV and is anguished. He thinks Chozhan had broken his deal and escapes from prison, by swallowing prawns making him choke and allergies. He plots against Chozhan by kidnapping the children of his area and addresses the community that in order to save their children, Ramalingam must die.

Rajiv attempts to brainwash someone into shooting Ramalingam to ensure the safety of their children, but to no avail. Rajiv extorts Ramalingam alone to commit suicide by drinking rat poison, after revealing that he killed his own father at the age of 13. In the meantime, Chozhan saves the children and returns with them to his community. Ramalingam dies, not before telling Chozhan to finish Rajiv. Chozhan confronts Rajiv inside a skyscraper and after an intense combat, Chozhan kicks Rajiv off the building and grabs him by his leg. In the end, he divulges about the Beijing corporates involvement in Anisha's death. Rajiv gets shocked after knowing the truth and tries to convince Chozhan to pull him up, but Chozhan drops him off the building leading to his death. Several years later, Chozhan takes his son and lays flowers on Ramalingam's grave and also on Rajiv's grave.

Cast

Production 
The principal photography of the film began in November 2020 and the shoot wrapped up on 12 July 2021.

Music 

The songs were composed by S. Thaman and Sam C. S. while the latter did the film score. This marks Thaman's third collaboration with Vishal after Pattathu Yaanai and Ayogya, as well as with Arya after Settai and Meaghamann, plus Sam's second collaboration with both Vishal and Thaman after the aforementioned Ayogya.

Release 

The film was initially scheduled to be theatrically released on 14 October 2021, but then pushed to 4 November 2021. The digital Rights of the film were sold to SonyLIV and was streamed on 18 February 2022.

Reception

Critical reception 
Ranjani Krishnakumar of Film Companion wrote, "Enemy is like Vishal’s dance — full-bodied, hard-working, energetic, confident, but entirely devoid of knack. That doesn’t make it unwatchable though." 

The Times of India gave the film 3 out of 5 writing "Arya as Rajiv looks perfect and menacing. His character holds the audience with its rage. Only if the writing had been little better, his role could have possibly been one of the best villain acts. Vishal, too, lives up beyond the expectations and does justice to his role. RD Rajasekhar's visuals add up to the hype and the cuts (Raymond Derrick Crasta is the editor) look fast-paced for an engaging thriller. The stunt sequence in the climax is neatly done and definitely deserves a mention." Behindwoods gave the film 2.5 out of 5 writing "Overall, the film works well technically and engages you well. The entertainment quotient is mostly fulfilled by the various action scenes and the film does justice to the action-drama genre. Vishal and Arya carry the film throughout on their shoulders and also save it from disappointing you. Though not a great film by any means, Enemy will satisfy you." Moviecrow gave the film 2.5 out of 5 writing "Despite the issues with the writing Enemy is a watchable affair."

Only Kolywood gave the film 2.25 out of 5 writing "Vishal brings out a convincing performance in the lead role, as he has lots to do in the film including song sequences. The actor is particularly spectacular in the action blocks. Arya offers excellent support, playing the negative role to perfection and also carrying out the fight sequences in the right way."

The Hindu stated that "Despite the implications of protagonists being geniuses, none of their acts to outdo each other is particularly clever. Maybe that is why, in the end, they abandon brains for brawn and settle their scores over a bloody brawl." Pinkvilla gave the film 3 out of 5 and wrote "The technicalities, camera work, visual effects, and quality of the film are rich. This festive season, it gives all the entertainment that's needed for the adrenaline rush of the audiences who have been waiting for a good film in the theatres." Firstpost gave the film 2 out of 5 writing "For a film that is mounted on a rivalry, the equation between Chozhan and Rajiv is pretty shallow and one-dimensional."

References

External links 
 

2021 action thriller films
Indian action thriller films
Films set in Singapore
Films scored by Thaman S
Films scored by Sam C. S.
2020s Tamil-language films